The Pilgrim is the 10th studio album of country music artist Marty Stuart, released in 1999. It is a concept album, telling the story of a man (The Pilgrim) from Marty Stuart's hometown of Philadelphia, Mississippi. Stuart plays the role of the Pilgrim, as well as other roles.
It was a significant move in Stuart's career, as before The Pilgrim, he had been focusing more on trying to score a hit song instead of making the music that really mattered to him. With this album, he demonstrates his songwriting skills (every track is either written or co-written by Stuart) and his diverse instrumental skills. The album features many country/bluegrass legends as guest stars, including Emmylou Harris, Pam Tillis, George Jones, Ralph Stanley, Earl Scruggs and Johnny Cash.

Plot
The Pilgrim is based on a true story of a man from Stuart's hometown, named Norman. Everyone was surprised when Norman (described as "cross-eyed Norman" in the album's liner notes) married Rita, the town's beauty queen.
As time went by Norman grew more and more possessive and jealous. Rita took comfort in the charms of a man she worked with at the hospital. That man was The Pilgrim, who came from a town 40 miles away, and did not know that Rita was married. She never responded to his affections, despite the fact that he begged her to marry him. She never told him she was married.
Norman began to feel the distance between him and Rita at home, and knew she was on the verge of leaving him.
One evening, Norman came home, and Rita wasn't there. He wrote her a letter, put it in his coat pocket, got his gun and went in search of his wife. He found her at the hospital - holding hands with The Pilgrim. He began making threats, and The Pilgrim, not knowing who Norman was, jumped up to defend Rita. She had to finally admit that she was married.
Norman then regained control, and shook The Pilgrim's hand, saying "I just wanted to meet the man that tore up my home and let him see what it's done". The Pilgrim tried reasoning with Norman, claiming that he did not know Rita was married, but his words fell on deaf ears. Norman kissed Rita, told her that he loved her more than life, handed her the letter, and shot himself in the head.
After Norman's funeral, Rita left town to escape the scandal, and The Pilgrim was in despair. He truly loved Rita. The only thing he was guilty of was falling in love with a woman that he didn't know was married. He left town, and began hitchhiking and hoboing all across America. He developed a drinking problem, and rode the rails until he reached the Pacific.
It was at the Pacific where he decided that the love he had known had to be put back together. He tracked Rita down, and today the couple are happily married and raising a family.

Reception
The album fared poorly in the charts, but was popular amongst critics and Stuart's fans, receiving almost entirely positive reviews.

Track listing

Deluxe Edition
In honor of the album's 20th anniversary in 2019, The Pilgrim was reissued in several forms, including digital and vinyl deluxe editions featuring 10 previously unreleased bonus tracks.  In addition, a coffee table book was released under the title of The Pilgrim: A Wall-To-Wall Odyssey.  The package includes a CD of the original album and the deluxe edition tracks and the text itself tells the story of the album's history and production, as well as its ultimate release and reappraisal.

The Marty Stuart Show
Marty Stuart (alongside his Fabulous Superlatives) often performs tracks from this album on The Marty Stuart Show on RFD-TV. They have performed tracks such as 'Reasons', 'Red, Red Wine, And Cheatin' Songs', 'Hobo's Prayer', 'The Greatest Love Of All Time', 'The Pilgrim (Act III)' and with special guest Earl Scruggs, 'Mr John Henry, Steel Driving Man'.

Personnel
As listed in liner notes
 Marty Stuart - lead vocals, acoustic guitar, electric guitar, mandolin

The Rock & Roll Cowboys
 Steve Arnold - bass
 Gary Hogue - Steel guitar
 Brad Davis - Vocals, electric guitar, acoustic guitar
 Gregg Stocki - drums, timpani, percussion

Personnel
 Jamie Tate - Recording and Mix Engineer
 Mike Campbell - 12-string guitar, electric guitar
 Tony Brown - Piano
 Barry Beckett - Hammond B-3 organ
 Stuart Duncan - Fiddle
 Larry Marrs - Background vocals
 Johnny Counterfeit - voices
 Earl Scruggs - acoustic guitar, banjo
 "Uncle" Josh Graves - dobro
 Carl Marsh - sound fx, calliope, organ
 Rusty Golden - piano
 Mike Bub - upright bass
 Jim Brown - B3 organ, piano
 Johnny Cash - vocals on 'Outro'
 George Jones - vocals on 'Truckstop'
 Emmylou Harris - vocals on 'The Pilgrim (Act I)' and 'Truckstop'
 Pam Tillis - vocals on 'Reasons'
 Ralph Stanley & The Clinch Mountain Boys - vocals, banjo, acoustic bass, acoustic guitar and fiddle on 'Harlan County' and 'The Pilgrim (Act II)
 Matt Spicher - 2nd Recording Engineer
 Hank Williams - Mastering

Chart performance

References

1999 albums
Albums produced by Marty Stuart
Marty Stuart albums
MCA Records albums
Albums produced by Tony Brown (record producer)